Daniil Yaroslavovich Gavilovskiy (born 21 March 1990) is a Russian former football goalkeeper.

Club career
He made his Russian Football National League debut for FC Khimik Dzerzhinsk on 13 July 2013 in a game against FC Baltika Kaliningrad.

External links
 

1990 births
Sportspeople from Barnaul
Living people
Russian footballers
Association football goalkeepers
FC Dynamo Barnaul players
FC Tom Tomsk players
FC Tambov players
FC Khimik Dzerzhinsk players
FC Chita players